Bádenas is a municipality located in the province of Teruel, Aragon, Spain. According to the 2004 census (INE), the municipality has a population of 19 inhabitants.

See also
 Sierra de Oriche, long system of mountain ranges lies approximately 30 kilometres

Gallery

References 

Municipalities in the Province of Teruel